French Cup or Coupe de France may refer to:

 Coupe de France, a French men's football competition
 Coupe de France Féminine, a French women's football competition
 Coupe de France (rugby union), a French rugby union competition
 Coupe de France Lord Derby, a French rugby league competition
 Coupe de France (ice hockey), a French ice hockey competition
 Coupe de France (handball), a French men's handball competition
 Coupe de France (women's handball), a French women's handball competition
 Coupe de France de robotique, a French robotics competition
 French Cup (synchronized skating), a synchronized skating competition held in Rouen, France
 French Road Cycling Cup, a French road bicycle racing competition